Dr. Shyam Bhat is a physician and psychiatrist of integrative medicine in India. He was the host of the radio show Heartline broadcast on Indigo 91.9 FM in Bangalore, India. He developed Integral Self Therapy, a transpersonal method that integrates insights from Vedanta and western psychotherapy.

References

External links
 http://www.shyambhat.com
 https://www.youtube.com/watch?v=Bvk5LmGhrJM

Indian psychiatrists
Indian radio presenters
Living people
Year of birth missing (living people)